When Darkness Falls is a 2006 Australian drama film written and directed by Rohan Spong that starred Sarah Bollenberg, Elizabeth Sandy and Natalie Bassingthwaighte. It was released on 8 July 2006.

Cast
 Sarah Bollenberg as Virginia Martin
 Elizabeth Sandy as Betsy Sloane
 Natalie Bassingthwaighte as Jinx de Luxe
 Katy Manning as Miss Harrington
 Olivia Crang as Josephine
 Angelina Elkin as Izzy Edwards
 Justin Hosking as Spud Cain
 Toby Newton as Police Commissioner Ed
 Peter Stratford as Coroner Paul Jenkins
 Trent Baker as Harry
 Randall Berger as Mayor Alfred
 Natalie Hoflin as Laura

Release
The film was released on 8 July 2006 at the Melbourne Underground Film Festival.

Reception
The film was a hit with critics, with some saying that it "heralded the rebirth of the Australian shorter feature film" and that it was an "accomplished homage to film noir". Katy Manning won Best Supporting Actress at the Melbourne Underground Film Festival for her role as Miss Harrington. The film was given several awards as it toured the festival circuits.

References

External links
 

Australian crime drama films